This list of tallest buildings in New Alamein which is one of Egypt new cities and it ranks all completed or under construction buildings by height in this Mediterranean City.

Skyscrapers and towers under-construction

Future proposed towers

References

Tallest, New Alamein
New Alamein